Legendary may refer to:

 Legend, a folklore genre   
 Legendary (hagiography)
 Anjou Legendarium
 J. R. R. Tolkien's legendarium

Film and television
 Legendary (film), a 2010 American sports drama film
 Legendary, a 2013 film featuring Dolph Lundgren
 Legendary (TV series), a 2020 American reality competition series
 "Legendary" (Legends of Tomorrow), a television episode

Music

Albums
 Legendary (AZ album), 2009
 Legendary (The Summer Set album) or the title song, 2013
 Legendary (TQ album) or the title song, 2013
 Legendary (Tyga album) or the title song, 2019
 Legendary (Z-Ro album), 2016
 Legendary (Zao album), 2003
 Legendary, by Kaysha, 2006
 The Legendary, an EP by the Roots, 1999

Songs
 "Legendary" (Deadmau5 and Shotty Horroh song), 2017
 "Legendary" (Welshly Arms song), 2016
 "Legendary", by Alaska Thunderfuck from Anus, 2015
 "Legendary", by Daya from Daya, 2015
 "Legendary", by Royce da 5'9" from Success Is Certain, 2011
 "Legendary", by Skillet from Victorious, 2019

Other uses
 Legendary (video game), a 2008 first-person shooter
 Legendary: A Marvel Deck Building Game, a board game
 Legendary Entertainment, an American film production and mass media company
 Legendary Comics, an American comic book publisher founded in 2010
 Legendary Pokémon, a group of fictional species in the Pokémon franchise

See also
 Legend (disambiguation)